Andreas Demetriou (born 4 July 1958) is a former Australian rules footballer who played for South Melbourne in the Victorian Football League (VFL) and Port Melbourne in the Victorian Football Association (VFA).

Playing career
Demetriou made one VFL appearance for South Melbourne as a reserve in a match against Collingwood in June 1977.

After leaving South Melbourne, he moved to Port Melbourne where he played in two VFA premiership-winning teams.

Post-football career
As well as acting as a sport psychologist for Werribee Football Club, Demetriou runs a deli in the Melbourne suburb of Albert Park.

References

1958 births
Sydney Swans players
Port Melbourne Football Club players
Sports psychologists
Living people
Australian rules footballers from Victoria (Australia)
Australian people of Greek Cypriot descent